Arrhyton vittatum, the Cuban short-tailed racerlet or common island racer, is a species of snake in the family Colubridae. It is found in Cuba.

References 

Arrhyton
Reptiles described in 1861
Reptiles of Cuba
Taxa named by Juan Gundlach